The 2014 Winter Olympics and Paralympics venues are divided between two "clusters" located in and around Sochi, Russia.

Venues

Coastal Cluster

Located in the Adler City District of Sochi, Imeretinsky Valley, on the Black Sea, the Olympic Park houses the main Olympic Stadium used for the Games' ceremonies, and venues for indoor sports such as hockey, figure skating, curling, and speed skating. It also houses training facilities, the Olympic Village, the international broadcasting centre, and other amenities. The park is designed so that all of the venues are accessible within walking distance of each other. The venues are situated around a water basin containing a fountain known as "The Waters of the Olympic Park"; designed by California-based WET (which also designed the cauldron for the 2002 Winter Olympics in Salt Lake City), the fountain measures 5.3 meters in diameter with a capacity of about 700,000 gallons of water, featuring more than 250 nozzles and jet systems that can create fog and choreographed water displays set to music.

The Olympic Village is built in the Olympic Park, on the shores of the Black Sea. It was built by Basic Element. It consists of 47 buildings and is designed for three thousand people. Athletes, journalists and members of the Olympic family will live there. After the competition, the Olympic Village will be an off-season resort complex Sochnoye or "Juicy".

Mountain Cluster

Updates
Environmental protection measures are being used in venue construction. These include being climate-neutral, games in harmony with nature, zero waste, and raising environmental awareness in preparing and hosting the 2014 Games. The 100th environmental protection measure was completed in October 2010. Slopes at the Rosa Khutor Alpine Resort were completed on 26 November 2010. A European Ski competition took place in early 2011 while a World Cup event took place in 2012.

Post-Olympic usage

In October 2010, it was announced that the area around the Coastal Cluster would be used as part of a Formula 1 racing circuit to hold its first race in 2014. The Winter Games were completed with no problems and the first Grand Prix at the Sochi Autodrom took place on the 12th October 2014, which was won by Lewis Hamilton and the fastest lap was set by Valtteri Bottas.

The World Chess Championship 2014 was held in Sochi in November.

On 2 December 2010, FIFA (International Federation of Association Football) awarded their 2018 World Cup to Russia. Among the venues to be used will be Central Stadium (known as Sochi Olympic Stadium in Russia's bid package to FIFA), which will be expanded to seat 47,659 after the Games.

References

External links

 
2014 Winter Olympics venues
2014 Winter Paralympics